Hayasaka (written: 早坂) is a Japanese surname. Notable people with the surname include:

, Japanese composer
, Japanese baseball player
, Japanese illustrator and manga artist
, Japanese footballer
, Japanese actress and singer

Japanese-language surnames